František Hirsch (27 November 1874 – 9 June 1942) was a Bohemian cyclist. He competed in the men's sprint event at the 1900 Summer Olympics.

References

External links
 

1874 births
1942 deaths
Czech male cyclists
Olympic cyclists of Bohemia
Cyclists at the 1900 Summer Olympics
Place of birth missing
Sportspeople from the Austro-Hungarian Empire